
Year 390 BC was a year of the pre-Julian Roman calendar. At the time, it was known as the Year of the Tribunate of Ambustus, Longus, Ambustus, Fidenas, Ambustus and Cornelius (or, less frequently, year 364 Ab urbe condita). The denomination 390 BC for this year has been used since the early medieval period, when the Anno Domini calendar era became the prevalent method in Europe for naming years.

Events 
 By place 

 Roman Republic 
 July 18 – Battle of the Allia: Brennus, a chieftain of the Senones of the Adriatic coast of Italy, leads an army of Cisalpine Gauls in their attack on Rome. They capture the entire city of Rome except for the Capitoline Hill, which is successfully held against them. However, seeing their city devastated, the Romans attempt to buy their salvation from Brennus. The Romans agree to pay one thousand pounds weight of gold.

 Egypt 
 The Pharaoh of Egypt, Hakor (Akoris), concludes a tripartite alliance with Evagoras, king of Cyprus, and Athens.

 By topic 

 Architecture 
 The Temple of Asclepius is built at Epidaurus.

Births 
 Hypereides, Athenian orator and politician (approximate date)
 The Tollund Man (approximate date, based on his being forty years old at the time of death)

Deaths 
 Andocides, Athenian orator and politician (b. 440 BC)

References